Orchestina manicata, is a species of spider of the genus Orchestina. It is native to Sri Lanka and Vietnam.

See also
 List of Oonopidae species

References

Oonopidae
Spiders of Asia
Arthropods of Sri Lanka
Arthropods of Vietnam
Spiders described in 1893